Andrei "White Cat" Kotsur (born 11 September 1982) is a Belarusian Muay Thai welterweight kickboxer fighting out of the Gym "Kick Fighter in Minsk, Belarus where is trained by Evgeni Kotelnikov.  He is a four time pro world and three time European (two pro, one amateur) Muay Thai champion.

Career/Biography

Andrei started his kickboxing career at the Gym "Kick Fighter" in Minsk under the tutelage of Evgeni Kotelnikov in 1999.  As a member of the strongest Muay Thai gym in Belarus and possibly Europe, he gained experience from training alongside champions such as Andrei Kulebin, Dmitry Shakuta, Dmitry Valent, Vasily Shish and Aliaksei Pekarchyk.  He first gave notice of his rising talent by taking part in two title fights (albeit unsuccessful) for the World Kickboxing Network (W.K.N) European and world titles in 2001 and 2002 respectively.  Andrei also competed in amateur competition, picking up a silver medal at the amateur European championships held in Cyprus in 2002 as well as winning gold two years later at the W.A.K.O. European championships in Budva.

In 2003 Andrei won his first pro title, winning an eight-man tournament in Italy to win up the "King of the Ring" European grand prix at 65 kg (143 lbs).  He  then followed this up by going to Australia where he defeated Australian based Thai Rhino Pichitchai to claim the I.M.T.F. World Profi Cup.  More titles followed the next year as Andrei won first the W.K.N. European title, giving him a shot against world champion Dan Rawlings, who he promptly defeated by decision when the United States team came to Belarus.  The following year Andrei gained revenge against a previous opponent who had defeated him, knocking out nine time world champion Osman Yigin in the second round of their match to hold on to his W.K.N. world title.  Another successful defence followed as Andrei headed to Turin, Italy where he finished the Italian challenger via a brutal flurry of elbows in the third round.

In 2006 Andrei headed to England where he faced WAKO-Pro world champion Kieran Keddle in a bout for the vacant W.P.K.L. world title.  Andrei was unsuccessful after five rounds as the English fighter dominated him but despite the loss would take part in a number of cards across the country over the next couple of years, defeating the likes of Richard Cadden and Nico Verresen but losing to Luke Turner in what was quite an upset as Luke was an upcoming fighter who was standing in for Kostur's original opponent multiple world champion Liam Harrison.  Sandwiched between the matches in England was a loss against legendary Full-Contact champion Samir Mohammed in Paris and a victory over a Thai opponent to claim the W.P.K.A. world title, both in 2009.

Andrei returned to England in 2010, winning an eight-man tournament in Birmingham where he defeated three local fighters in one night to be crowned champion.  He also faced and lost to a Thai fighter Prathet Sor Thannikel at a Muay Thai show in Crawley.  He is currently looking to take part in the W.K.N. Big-8 Grand Prix, to be held in Trinidad and Tobago involving some of the best Muay Thai fighters in the world around the 67-69 kg (147.4-151.8 lbs) mark.

Titles

Professional
2010 Fight Sport "Champions Trophy" tournament champion -67 kg  
2009 W.P.K.A. world champion
2005 W.K.N. Muay Thai super welterweight world champion -62.1 kg (2nd defence) 
2005 W.K.N. Muay Thai world champion -62.1 kg (1st defence) 
2004 W.K.N. Muay Thai world champion -62.1 kg
2004 W.K.N. Muay Thai super welterweight European champion -62.1 kg
2003 I.M.T.F. World Profi Cup champion  
2003 W.I.P.U. "King of the Ring" Europe Grand Prix tournament champion -65 kg

Amateur
2004 W.A.K.O. European Championships in Budva, Serbia & Montenegro  -63 kg (Thai-boxing)
2002 I.A.M.T.F. European Championships in Cyprus

Professional Kickboxing Record 

|-
|-  bgcolor=#FFBBBB
| 2010-11-07 || Loss ||align=left| Prathet Sor Thannikel || Muaythai Warriors XVIII || Crawley, England, UK || Decision || 5 || 3:00  
|-
|-  bgcolor="#CCFFCC"
| 2010-09-11 || Win ||align=left| Thomas McCormick || Fight Sport Champions Trophy, Final || Birmingham, England, UK || Decision || 3 || 3:00  
|-
! style=background:white colspan=9 |
|- 
|-  bgcolor="#CCFFCC"
| 2010-09-11 || Win ||align=left| Dave Copestake || Fight Sport Champions Trophy, Semi Final  || Birmingham, England, UK || Decision || 3 || 3:00  
|-
|-  bgcolor="#CCFFCC"
| 2010-09-11 || Win ||align=left| Tim Thomas || Fight Sport Champions Trophy, Quarter Final || Birmingham, England, UK || Decision || 3 || 3:00  
|-
|-  bgcolor=#FFBBBB
| 2010-05-15 || Loss ||align=left| Luke Turner || Rumble at the Reebok II || Bolton, England, UK || TKO (Cut/Elbows) || 2 ||  
|-
|-  bgcolor="#CCFFCC"
| 2009-11-24 || Win ||align=left| Surchit || || Yakutsk, Russia || || ||  
|-
! style=background:white colspan=9 |
|- 
|-  bgcolor=#FFBBBB
| 2009-03-26 || Loss ||align=left| Samir Mohamed || Les Stars du Ring || Paris, France || Decision || 5 || 3:00 
|-
|-  bgcolor="#CCFFCC"
| 2007-11-11 || Win ||align=left| Mohamed Elaouaji || Kings of Muay Thai - Russia || Kostroma, Russia || Decision || 5 || 3:00  
|-
|-  bgcolor="#CCFFCC"
| 2007-10-07 || Win ||align=left| Nico Verresen || Muaythai Warriors IX || Crawley, England, UK || Decision || 5 || 3:00  
|-
|-  bgcolor="#CCFFCC"
| 2007-06-01 || Win ||align=left| Paitoon Jaikon || Belarus vs Thailand || Minsk, Belarus || Decision || 5 || 3:00  
|-
|-  bgcolor="#CCFFCC"
| 2006-09-24 || Win ||align=left| Richard Cadden || Master Sken's Combat Super Fights || Manchester, England, UK || TKO (Right Punch) || 5 ||   
|-
|-  bgcolor="#FFBBBB"
| 2006-04-29 || Loss ||align=left| Kieran Keddle || Muaythai Warriors || Crawley, England, UK || Decision || 5 || 3:00  
|-
! style=background:white colspan=9 |
|- 
|-  bgcolor="#CCFFCC"
| 2005-00-00 || Win ||align=left| Filippo Cinti || || Turin, Italy || KO (Elbows) || 3 ||  
|-
! style=background:white colspan=9 |
|- 
|-  bgcolor="#CCFFCC"
| 2005-09-30 || Win ||align=left| Osman Yigin || Kings of Muaythai: Belarus vs Europe || Minsk, Belarus || KO || 2 ||  
|-
! style=background:white colspan=9 |
|- 
|-  bgcolor="#CCFFCC"
| 2004-07-01 || Win ||align=left| Dan Rawlings || Kings of Muaythai: Team USA vs. Team Belarus || Minsk, Belarus || Decision || 5 || 3:00  
|-
! style=background:white colspan=9 |
|- 
|-  bgcolor="#CCFFCC"
| 2004-00-00 || Win ||align=left| Baker Barakat || || Germany || KO || ||  
|-
! style=background:white colspan=9 |
|- 
|-  bgcolor="#CCFFCC"
| 2003-05-17 || Win ||align=left| Rhino Pichitchai || Burswood Muaythai World Super Cup || Perth, Australia || Decision || 5 || 3:00 
|-
! style=background:white colspan=9 |
|-
|-  bgcolor="#CCFFCC"
| 2002-00-00 || Win ||align=left| Maxim Dubov || Belarus vs Ukraine || Minsk, Belarus ||  ||  || 
|-
|-  bgcolor="#FFBBBB"
| 2002-00-00 || Loss ||align=left| Osman Yigin || || Belgium || Decision || 5 || 3:00  
|-
! style=background:white colspan=9 |
|-  
|-  bgcolor="#FFBBBB"
| 2001-06-09 || Loss ||align=left| Dennis Koebke || K-1 World GP '01 Prelim. Scandinavia || Copenhagen, Denmark || Decision || 5 || 3:00  
|-
! style=background:white colspan=9 |
|-  
|-
| colspan=9 | Legend:

Amateur Kickboxing Record 

|-
|-  bgcolor="#CCFFCC"
| 2004-11-24 || Win ||align=left| Philip Billides || W.A.K.O. European Championships '04, Final || Budva, Serbia and Montenegro || Decision (Unanimous) || 3 || 3:00 
|-
! style=background:white colspan=9 |
|-
|-  bgcolor="#CCFFCC"
| 2004-11-00 || Win ||align=left| József Vulics || W.A.K.O. European Championships '04, Semi Final || Budva, Serbia and Montenegro || Decision (Unanimous) || 3 || 3:00  
|-
|-
| colspan=9 | Legend:

See also 
List of male kickboxers

References

External links
 Gym "Kick Fighter" Official Website

1982 births
Living people
Belarusian male kickboxers
Belarusian Muay Thai practitioners
Welterweight kickboxers
Lightweight kickboxers
Featherweight kickboxers